George R. Stewart Peak is a 7,389-foot-elevation (2,252 meter) summit in Nevada County, California, United States.

Description
George R. Stewart Peak is located one-half mile northeast of Donner Pass, on land managed by Tahoe National Forest. It is situated in the Sierra Nevada mountain range, with precipitation runoff from the peak draining to Donner Lake. The Pacific Crest Trail traverses the peak, providing an approach from Donner Pass.

History
This landform's toponym was officially adopted in October 1984 by the U.S. Board on Geographic Names to posthumously honor George R. Stewart (1895–1980), an American historian, toponymist, professor of English at the University of California, Berkeley for 56 years, and novelist who authored numerous books including a classic study of the ill-fated Donner Party. Stewart's old friend Wallace Stegner petitioned the board, writing: "A country which has wasted a lot of peaks on Secretaries of the Interior, Secretaries of War, Directors of the Naval Observatory and other Washington figures would ennoble itself by naming whatever peak is left after George R. Stewart, because his books may actually last, considering the way we chew up the environment, longer than the peaks themselves". This particular peak was named for him because the Sierra Nevada and the Donner Pass area both figured prominently in many of his novels, and the "full commemorative name" was given to avoid ambiguity and make the referent person unmistakable.  Another reason this peak is appropriate for its namesake is because the historic U.S. Route 40, which was a major cross-country route, traverses the peak's eastern and southern slopes, and Stewart wrote books about US highways based on his cross-country drives of 1924, 1949 and 1950 when he drove past this peak which now bears his name.

Climate
According to the Köppen climate classification system, George R. Stewart Peak is located in an alpine climate zone. Most weather fronts originate in the Pacific Ocean and travel east toward the Sierra Nevada mountains. As fronts approach, they are forced upward by the peaks (orographic lift), causing them to drop their moisture in the form of rain or snowfall onto the range. There are five ski areas at Donner Pass.

Gallery

See also
 
 Donner Pass

References

External links
 Weather forecast: George R. Stewart Peak
 George R. Stewart’s Life and Work, georgerstewart.com

North American 2000 m summits
Mountains of Northern California
Tahoe National Forest
Mountains of the Sierra Nevada (United States)
Mountains of Nevada County, California